Roland Hürzeler (17 March 1945 – 8 March 2023) was a Swiss gymnast. He competed in eight events at the 1968 Summer Olympics.

References

External links
 

1945 births
2023 deaths
Swiss male artistic gymnasts
Olympic gymnasts of Switzerland
Gymnasts at the 1968 Summer Olympics
People from Zofingen District
20th-century Swiss people